Bohdana may refer to:

People
 Bohdana Durda (born 1940), Ukrainian artist, writer, poet, and songwriter
 Bohdana Frolyak (born 1968), Ukrainian composer
 Bohdana Matsotska (born 1989), Ukrainian alpine skier

Other
 2S22 Bohdana, 155 mm NATO-standard artillery caliber, wheeled self-propelled howitzer developed in Ukraine
 Stadion imeni Bohdana Markevycha, sports stadium in Vynnyky, Ukraine